The  was a bomb target ship of the Imperial Japanese Navy (IJN) serving during the Second World War, the only ship of her class.

Background
Project number J32. Before the pacific war, the IJN wanted to raise the training efficiency of bombers for the outbreak of war. The Yakaze was converted to a target ship for bombing training, however, her armour was thin because she was converted from a destroyer. Yakaze was able to sustain only the impact of 1 kilogram bombs. The IJN wanted the target ship top join the Combined Fleet to use it in the southern front. Hakachi was built with such a background, she was able to sustain 10 kilogram bombs dropped from  meters altitude.  Hakachi was the only purpose-built vessel in the IJN designed as a bombing target ship. Her flat steel deck gave her the appearance of an escort carrier and protected against 10 and 30 kilogram training bombs. The IJN later built the Ōhama-class as a next generation target ships, because Hakachi was the only one available for training new pilots of bomber planes.

Service
The Hakachi was commissioned on 18 November 1943 and on 1 December, she was assigned to the Combined Fleet. On 24 December, she sailed to Truk where she was used for bomber training. Two months later, she was heavily damaged by U.S. carrier aircraft during Operation Hailstone. She sheltered at Palau on 24 February 1944, and was repaired by Akashi. She was modified to serve as an escort for local convoys and rearmed with two 4.7-inch and 28 Type 96 25-mm AA guns and carried 36 depth charges. On 18 March, she sailed to the Lingga Islands. On 24 May, she sailed to Davao Gulf. She worked in each place. On 1 October, she undertook convoy escort operations. She survived the war in the Seto Inland Sea. On 1 December 1945 the ship was assigned to the Allied Repatriation Service as a special transport ship. On 11 December 1946, Hakachi arrived at Sasebo on her last repatriation voyage. In all, she transported 1,641 former military personnel back to Japan. In 1947 she was scrapped in Osaka at Fujinagata Zosensho.

Bibliography
 Ships of the World special issue Vol.47 Auxiliary Vessels of the Imperial Japanese Navy, Kaijinsha, (Japan), March 1997
 The Maru Special, Japanese Naval Vessels No.34, Japanese Auxiliary ships, Ushio Shobō (Japan), December 1979
 Senshi Sōsho Vol.31, Naval armaments and war preparation (1), "Until November 1941", Asagumo Simbun (Japan), November 1969

World War II naval ships of Japan
1943 ships
Ships built by IHI Corporation